Testate amoebae (formerly thecamoebians, Testacea or Thecamoeba) are a polyphyletic group of unicellular amoeboid protists, which differ from naked amoebae in the presence of a test that partially encloses the cell, with an aperture from which the pseudopodia emerge, that provides the amoeba with shelter from predators and environmental conditions.

The test of some species is produced entirely by the amoeba and may be organic, siliceous or calcareous depending on the species (autogenic tests), whereas in other cases the test is made up of particles of sediment collected by the amoeba which are then agglutinated together by secretions from within the cell (xenogenic tests). A few taxa (Hyalosphenidae) can build either type, depending on the circumstances and availability of foreign material.

The assemblage referred to as "testate amoebae" is actually composed of several, unrelated groups of organisms. However, some features they all share that have been used to group them together include the presence of a test (regardless of its composition) and pseudopodia that do not anastomose.

Testate amoebae can be found in most freshwater environments, including lakes, rivers, cenotes, as well as mires and soils.

The strong and resistant nature of the tests allows them to be preserved long after the amoeba has died. These characteristics, along with the sensitivity that some species display to changes in environmental conditions (such as temperature, pH, and conductivity), has sparked their use as bioindicators and paleoclimate proxies in recent years.

Gallery

Taxonomy and classification 
Testate amoebae are a polyphyletic assemblage. The main testate amoebae groups are the lobose Tubulinea, which include Arcellinida, Difflugina and Phryganellina (within the Amoebozoa), and the filose Euglyphida (within the SAR supergroup), although there are smaller groups that also include other testate amoebae.

Order Arcellinida 

Family Arcellidae
 Arcella - Ehrenberg 1832
 Antarcella - Deflandre 1928

Family Netzeliidae
 Netzelia - Ogden 1979

Family Hyalospheniidae
 Quadrulella - Cockerell 1909
 Hyalosphenia - Stein 1859
 Alocodera - Jung 1942
 Apodera - Loeblich & Tappan 1961
 Certesella - Loeblich & Tappan 1961
 Porosia - Jung 1942
 Nebela - Leidy 1874
 Padaungiella - Lara & Todorov 2012

Family Microchlamyiidae
 Microchlamys - Cockerell 1911
 Spumochlamys - Kudryavtsev & Hausmann 2007

Family Plagiopyxidae
 Bullinularia - Deflandre 1953
 Geoplagiopyxis - Chardez 1961
 Protoplagiopyxis - Bonnet 1962
 Paracentropyxis - Bonnet 1960
 Plagiopyxis - Penard 1910
 Hoogenraadia - Gauthier-Lievre & Thomas 1958
 Planhoogenraadia - Bonnet 1977

Family Cryptodifflugiidae
 Cryptodifflugia - Penard 1890
 Wailesella - Deflandre 1928

Family Microcoryciidae
 Amphizonella - Greeff 1866
 Diplochlamys - Greeff 1888
 Microcorycia - Cockerell 1911
 Penardochlamys - Deflandre 1953
 Zonomyxa - Nusslin 1882
 Parmulina - Penard 1902

Family Phryganellidae
 Phryganella - Penard 1902

Family Lamtopyxidae
 Lamtopyxis - Bonnet 1974

Family Distomatopyxidae
 Distomatopyxis - Bonnet 1964

Family Paraquadrulidae
 Paraquadrula - Deflandre 1932
 Lamtoquadrula - Bonnet 1974

Family Centropyxidae
 Centropyxis - Stein 1857
 Proplagiopyxis - Schonborn 1964

Family Trigonopyxidae
 Trigonopyxis - Penard 1912
 Cyclopyxis - Deflandre 1929
 Geopyxella - Bonnet & Thomas 1955
 Cornuapyxis - Couteaux and Chardez 1981

Incertae sedis
 Argynnia - Vucetich 1974
 Awerintzewia - Schouteden 1906
 Cucurbitella - Penard 1902
 Difflugia - Leclerc 1815
 Geamphorella - Bonnet 1959
 Heleopera - Leidy 1879
 Jungia - Loeblich and Tappan 1961
 Lagenodifflugia - Medioli & Scott 1983
 Leptochlamys - West 1901
 Lesquereusia - Schlumberger 1845
 Maghrebia - Gauthier-Lievre & Thomas 1960
 Mediolus - Patterson 2014
 Microquadrula - Golemansky 1968
 Oopyxis - Jung 1942
 Pentagonia - Gauthier-Lievre & Thomas 1960
 Physochila - Jung 1942
 Pomoriella - Golemansky 1970
 Pontigulasia - Rhumbler 1896
 Protocucurbitella - Gauthier-Lievre & Thomas 1960
 Pseudawerintzewia - Bonnet 1959
 Pseudonebela - Gauthier-Lievre 1953
 Pyxidicula - Ehrenberg 1838
 Schoenbornia - Decloitre 1964
 Schwabia - Jung 1942
 Sexangularia - Awerintzew 1906
 Suiadifflugia - Green 1975
 Zivkovicia - Ogden 1987
 Ellipsopyxis - Bonnet 1965
 Ellipsopyxella - Bonnet 1975

Order Euglyphida 

Family Euglyphidae
 Euglypha - Dujardin, 1841
 Scutiglypha - Foissner and Schiller, 2001

Family Trinematidae
 Trinema - Dujardin 1841
 Corythion - Taranek 1881
 Puytoracia - Bonnet, 1970
 Playfairina - Thomas 1961
 Pileolus - Coûteaux and Chardez 1962

Family Sphenoderiidae
 Sphenoderia - Schlumberger 1845
 Trachelocorythion - Bonnet 1979
 Deharvengia - Bonnet 1979

Family Assulinidae
 Assulina - Leidy 1879
 Placocista - Leidy 1879
 Valkanovia - Tappan 1966

Family Cyphoderiidae
 Cyphoderia - Schlumberger 1845
 Corythionella - Golemansky 1970
 Campascus - Leidy 1879
 Messemvriella - Golemansky 1973
 Pseudocorythion - Valkanov 1970
 Schaudinnula - Awerintzev 1907

Family Paulinellidae
 Paulinella - Lauterborn 1895
 Ovulinata - Anderson, Rogerson & Hannah 1996
 Micropyxidiella - Tarnawski & Lara 2015

Incertae sedis
 Pareuglypha - Penard 1902
 Ampullataria - Van Oye 1956
 Euglyphidion - Bonnet 1960
 Heteroglypha - Thomas and Gauthier-Lièvre 1959
 Tracheleuglypha - Deflandre 1928

Other Cercozoa 

Family Chlamydophryidae
 Capsellina - Penard 1909
 Lecythium - Hertwig and Lesser 1876
 Rhogostoma - Belar 1921
 Rhizaspis - Skuja 1948
 Chlamydophrys - Cienkowsky 1876
 Clypeolina - Cienkowsky 1877
 Penardeugenia - Deflandre 1953
 Leptochlamydophrys - Belar 1921
 Diaphoropodon - Archer 1869

Family Pseudodifflugiidae
 Pseudodifflugia - Schlumberger 1845

Family Psammonobiotidae
 Alepiella - Golemansky 1970
 Centropyxiella - Valkanov 1970
 Chardezia - Golemansky 1970
 Edaphonobiotus - Schönborn, Foissner & Meisterfeld 1983
 Micramphora - Valkanov 1970
 Micropsammella - Golemansky 1970
 Nadinella - Penard 1902
 Ogdeniella - Golemanski 1982
 Psammonobiotus - Golemansky 1970
 Propsammonobiotus - Golemansky 1991

Incertae sedis
 Feuerbornia - Jung, 1942
 Frenzelina - Penard 1902
 Lesquerella - Chardez and Thomas, 1980
 Matsakision - Bonnet, 1967
 Rhumbleriella - Golemansky 1970

Order Stramenopila

Family Amphitremidae
 Amphitrema - Archer 1869
 Archerella - Loeblich and Tappan, 1961

Family Diplophryidae
 Diplophrys - Barker 1868

Family Amphifilidae
 Amphifila - Anderson and Cavalier-Smith 2012

Family Sorodiplophryidae
 Sorodiplophris - Dykstra and Olive 1975

Unclassified testate amoebae 

 Paramphitrema - Valkanov 1970

The following table includes a few examples of testate amoebae genera, and reflects their position within the classification by Adl et al. (2012), where five supergroups (Amoebozoa, Opisthokonta, Excavata, SAR and Archaeplastida) were proposed to classify all eukaryotes. This classification purposefully avoids the use of Linnaean higher category names (phylum, class, order, family). While it has been noted that the names that Adl et al. provide for the clades may result confusing or uninformative regarding the relative degree of phenotypic distinctiveness amongst groups when used in isolation, this system avoids creating superfluous ranks where unnecessary and provides stable group names that can be retained even when a group is moved to a different lineage, as is often the case with protists, as their classification remains in constant review.

Traditionally, those species that form large networks of anastomosing pseudopodia, despite some of them having tests, are not counted amongst testate amoebae; this comprises genus Gromia and the Foraminifera (both in Rhizaria).

Notes 
The Thecamoebida (Amoebozoa), with the genus Thecamoeba, despite their name, do not have tests.

Euglyphid testate amoebae are closely related to the Foraminifera.

External links 
 Microworld - World of ameboid organisms - A database of both testate and naked amoebae with over 6,700 microphotographs and videos and over 1,700 species descriptions, as well as dichotomous and visual keys for identification.

References

Bibliography

 Medioli, F.S.; Scott, D.B.; Collins, E.; Asioli, S.; Reinhardt, E.G. (1999). The thecamoebian bibliography. Palaeontologia Electronica, 3: 1-161, .
 Medioli, F.S.; Bonnet, L.; Scott, D.B.; Medioli, B.E. (2003). The thecamoebian bibliography: 2nd edition. Palaeontologia Electronica, 61: 1-107, .

Amoeboids